Military Wives is a 2019 British comedy-drama film directed by Peter Cattaneo, from a screenplay by Rosanne Flynn and Rachel Tunnard. It stars Kristin Scott Thomas, Sharon Horgan and Jason Flemyng. The film is inspired by the true story of the Military Wives Choirs, a network of 75 choirs in British military bases across the United Kingdom and overseas, featured in the fourth season of the British documentary television series The Choir.

The film had its world premiere at the Toronto International Film Festival on 6 September 2019, and was released in the United Kingdom on 6 March 2020 by Lionsgate.

Synopsis
With their partners away serving in Afghanistan, a group of women on the home front form a choir and quickly find themselves at the centre of a media sensation and global movement.

Cast
 Kristin Scott Thomas as Kate
 Sharon Horgan as Lisa
 Jason Flemyng as Crooks
 Greg Wise as Richard
 Emma Lowndes as Annie
 Gaby French as Jess
 Lara Rossi as Ruby
 Amy James-Kelly as Sarah
 India Ria Amarteifio as Frankie
 Laura Checkley as Maz
 Sophie Dix as Beatrice
 Beverley Longhurst as Hilary
 Jack James Ryan as Private Shaw
 Karen Sampford as Choir Member
 Robbie Gee as Red

Production
In September 2018, it was announced Kristin Scott Thomas and Sharon Horgan had joined the cast of the film, with Peter Cattaneo directing, from a screenplay by Rosanne Flynn and Rachel Tunnard, with Lionsgate distributing in the United Kingdom.

Release
The film had its world premiere at the Toronto International Film Festival on 6 September 2019. Shortly after, Bleecker Street acquired US distribution rights to the film. It was released in the United Kingdom on 6 March 2020 and was scheduled to be released in the United States on 27 March. However, due to the COVID-19 pandemic, it was rescheduled to 22 May 2020, where the film will be released on video on demand instead of a planned theatrical release.

Reception
The site's critics consensus reads: "Like a favorite song you know by heart, Military Wives offers few surprises – but its pleasures are no less formidable by their familiarity." On Metacritic, the film has a weighted average score of 55 out of 100, based on 22 critics, indicating "mixed or average reviews".

The Guardian called it a "crowd-pleasing comedy drama" that "hits all the right notes". Richard Lawson of Vanity Fair praised the performances of Scott Thomas and Horgan, writing "Scott Thomas sells the film, and the sorrow at its heart, way better than everything else around her", but noted the film feels "hurried and thin".

References

External links
 
 
 

2019 films
2019 comedy-drama films
British comedy-drama films
Films directed by Peter Cattaneo
Films scored by Lorne Balfe
Films about grieving
Lionsgate films
2010s female buddy films
2010s English-language films
2010s British films